Below is a list of newspapers published in Bulgaria.

0-9

168 Chasa
24 Chasa (left-wing)
7 Dni Sport

A

ABV
Agrovestnik
Arh i Art borsa
Ataka
Avto Moto Svyat
Avto trud

B

Balgarsko voynstvo
Bilka
Biznes kontakti
Biznes vesti
Bojie slovo
Byudjeten konsultant
Byuletin Voenen glas
Bulgaria Today
Bulgaria Today/Bulgaria Dnes
Bulgarian army
Bulgarian farmer
Bulgarian transport newspaper
Bulgarian writer

C

Capital (liberal conservative, pro-business)

D

Dar
Darjaven vestnik
Detonatsia
Dneven Trud
Dnevnik
Duma

G

Gimnazist
Glaven schetovoditel

H

I

Idealen dom
Ikonomicheski jivot
Imoti
Impuls
Iskrenno i lichno

J

Jena
Jenski svyat
Jensko charstvo
Jensko zdrave

K

Krisse-basse
KESH
Kultura
Kuraj

L

Lechitel
Levski
Lichna drama
Literaturen vestnik

M

Makedonia
Maja Lugter
Media svyat
Meditsinski magazin
Mejduchasie
Meridian Match
Misterii na tsilivizatsyata
Mobilen svyat
Monitor
Moyata sadba
Morski vestnik
Moto spravochnik

N

Natsionalen kurier 5
Natsionalen podem
Natsionalna biznes poshta
Nad 55
Naroden lechitel
Nasluka
Nie jenite
NLO

O

Osteoporoza

P

Pchela i kosher
Pensioneri
Politika
Praktichna domakinya
Prelom

R

Rabotnichesko delo
Retsepti za zdrave
Revyu
Ribar
Ribolov
Rikcho
Riki kandidat-gimnazist
Rusia dnes

S

Semeen advokat
Semeen globus
Slavia
Smyah
Standart (newspaper)
Stomatologichen svyat
Strogo sektretno
Svetat v mrejata
Svobodna misal

T

Taber Sofia
 Trud

V

Vestnikat
Vkusen svyat
Vsichko za vseki

Z

Za jenata
Zastrahovatel
Zemedelska tehnika
Zemedelsko zname
Zemia
Zlatna vazrast
Zora Nova

See also
 List of magazines in Bulgaria

Further reading
 

Bulgaria
 
Newspapers